Between the Buried and Me is a North Carolina-based progressive metal band. The discography of the group has seen a shift from a short, song-based approach in their earlier albums to a more conceptual approach in their later offerings. The band has been known throughout their career for employing a wide variety of musical styles in their compositions, often combining them with technically demanding playing.

Studio albums

Live albums

Compilation albums
Dead and Dreaming: An Indie Tribute to Counting Crows (Victory, 2004) - "Colorblind"
Best Of (2011)

EPs

Singles
"Obfuscation" (2009)
"Bohemian Rhapsody" / "Vertical Beta 461" (2016)
"The Tank" / "Rapid Calm" split with The Dear Hunter (2018)

Music videos

Notes

References

External links
 
Official Victory Records profile

Heavy metal group discographies
Discographies of American artists